Marylin Frascone (born 1975 in Pamiers) is a contemporary French woman classical pianist.

Discography 
2007 - Franz Liszt's Pieces for piano (Transart/Naïve)
2008 - Moussorgsky's Pictures at an Exhibition; Chopin: Fantaisie, Berceuse, Mazurkas, Polonaise héroïque (Intégral Classic INT.221164)
2009 - Liszt's Sonata in B minor; Ravel's Gaspard de la nuit (Intégral Classic INT.221168)
2010 - Schumann, Mozart, Beethoven, Scriabin, Bizet/Horowitz: "Fantasies for piano", Integral Classic 221.174)

External links 
 Page on Pianobleu.com
 Marylin Frascone ou l’école franco-russe
 Marylin Frascone - Ravel, Gaspard de la Nuit (YouTube)

1975 births
People from Pamiers
Living people
21st-century French women classical pianists